The Old Man Who Read Love Stories is a 2001 Australian adventure drama film directed by Rolf de Heer. It is based on the book of the same name by Luis Sepulveda.

Although the film premiered in 2001 it was not seen in cinemas until 2004.

Cast
 Richard Dreyfuss as Antonio Bolivar
 Timothy Spall as Mayor Luis Agalla
 Hugo Weaving as Rubicondo the dentist
 Cathy Tyson as Josefina
 Victor Bottenbley as Nushino
 Fede Celada as Juan
 Luis Hostalot as Manuel
 Guillermo Toledo as Onecen

Reception

Accolades

References

External links
 
Review at The Age
"Rumble in the Jungle - the Making of The Old Man Who Read Love Stories"
The Old Man Who Read Love Stories at Urban Cinefile

2001 films
2000s adventure drama films
Australian adventure drama films
Films directed by Rolf de Heer
2001 drama films
2000s English-language films
2000s Australian films